Japan earth may refer to:

 Catechu
 Gambier (extract)